Bağlar is a village in the Üzümlü District, Erzincan Province, Turkey. The village is populated by Kurds and had a population of 82 in 2021.

The hamlets of Demirkapı, Erdem, Esen, Kamer, Mehmetağa, Mustafaçavuş, Salim, Taşpınar, Terzi and Uyanık are attached to the village.

References 

Villages in Üzümlü District
Kurdish settlements in Erzincan Province